Amir Hendeh (also Romanized as Amīr Hendeh; also known as Gūkeh and Gūkeh-ye Amīrhandeh) is a village in Kisom Rural District, in the Central District of Astaneh-ye Ashrafiyeh County, Gilan Province, Iran. At the 2006 census, its population was 664, in 207 families.

References 

Populated places in Astaneh-ye Ashrafiyeh County